The Ark (sometimes referred to by the first track from the EP Racing with the Rabbits) is the debut EP of the Swedish band the Ark.

Track listing

Personnel 
 Ola Svensson - Vocals
 Lars Ljungberg - Bass guitar
 Mikael Jepson - Guitar
 Martin Rosengardten - Drums

Additional musicians:
 Mats Andersson - Violin
 Erik Persson - Violin
 Tanja Nielsen - Cello
 Britta Svedskog - Bassoon
 Krister Miller - Clarinet

It is also possible that Salo/Svensson played guitar for the EP due to him playing guitar at then-contemporary gigs (sometimes keyboards) but since there is no personnel list for this release (only for additional musicians) the contributions are merely speculation based on blogs made by the Ark themselves.

References

1996 debut EPs
The Ark (Swedish band) albums